The blackbar filefish (Pervagor janthinosoma) is a fish in the family Monacanthidae. It is found in the tropical Indo-Pacific from the coast of east Africa to Samoa, north to southern Japan and south to New South Wales and Tonga.

External links
 PERVAGOR JANTHINOSOMA from New Caledonia (En/Fr)
 

Monacanthidae
Fish described in 1854